Willem Janssen may refer to:

 Willem Janssen (footballer, born 1880) (1880–1976), Dutch footballer
 Willem Janssen (footballer, born 1986), Dutch footballer